State Route 523 (SR 523, named 145th Street) is a short Washington state highway located on the city limits of Seattle, Shoreline and Lake Forest Park in King County.

Route description

From its western terminus, the roadway travels east to 1st Avenue NE, where SR 523 becomes Northeast 145th Street, which the road keeps until its eastern terminus. The SR 523 / I-5 interchange was used by an estimated 28,000 motorists daily based on average annual daily traffic (AADT) data collected by the Washington State Department of Transportation.

History

145th Street was paved by the King County government between 1934 and 1935. During the 1964 highway renumbering, SSH 1J became  and PSH 1 became I-5; the northern terminus of SR 513 became the current SR 523 / I-5 interchange. In 1991, the northern terminus of SR 513 was moved south to its current location, Magnuson Park and SR 523 was established.

Major intersections

References

External links

Highways of Washington State
I-5 Traffic Camera

523
Transportation in King County, Washington
Transportation in Seattle